Martinsburg is a city in and the seat of Berkeley County, West Virginia, in the tip of the state's Eastern Panhandle region in the lower Shenandoah Valley. Its population was 18,835 in the 2021 census estimate, making it the largest city in the Eastern Panhandle and the sixth-largest municipality in the state. Martinsburg is part of the Hagerstown-Martinsburg, MD-WV Metropolitan Statistical Area.

History
Martinsburg was established by an act of the Virginia General Assembly that was adopted in December 1778 during the American Revolutionary War. Founder Major General Adam Stephen named the gateway town to the Shenandoah Valley along Tuscarora Creek in honor of Colonel Thomas Bryan Martin, a nephew of Thomas Fairfax, 6th Lord Fairfax of Cameron.

Aspen Hall, a Georgian mansion, is the oldest house in the city. Part was built in 1745 by Edward Beeson, Sr. Aspen Hall, and its wealthy residents had key roles in the agricultural, religious, transportation, and political history of the region. Significant events related to the French and Indian War, the Revolution, and the Civil War took place on the property. Three original buildings are still standing, including the rare blockhouse of Mendenhall's Fort.

The first United States post office in what is now West Virginia was established at Martinsburg in 1792. At that time, Martinsburg and the larger territory were still part of Virginia.

The Baltimore and Ohio Railroad (B&O) reached Martinsburg in 1842. The Baltimore and Ohio Railroad Martinsburg Shops were constructed in 1849 and rebuilt after the American Civil War.

According to William Still, "The Father of the Underground Railroad" and its historian:  Mr Robert Brown, alias Thomas Jones, escaped from slavery in Martinsburg on Christmas night in 1856. He rode a horse and had it swim across the freezing Potomac River. After riding forty miles, he walked in cold wet clothes for two days, to Harrisburg, Pennsylvania. He received assistance there from the Underground Railroad and traveled by train to Philadelphia, and the office of William Still with the Pennsylvania Anti-Slavery Society. Brown's wife and four children had been sold; he sought help to find them. He had a likeness of his wife, and locks of hair from each of them.

Civil war

In 1854, ten-year-old Isabelle Boyd, known as "Belle" and later a noted spy for the Confederacy, moved to Martinsburg with her family, where her father Benjamin operated a general merchandise store. After the Civil War began, Benjamin joined the Second Virginia Infantry, which was part of the Stonewall Brigade. His wife Mary was thus in charge of the Boyd home when Union forces under General Robert Patterson took Martinsburg. When a group of Patterson's men tried to raise a Union flag over the Boyd home, Mary refused. One of the soldiers, Frederick Martin, threatened Mary, and Belle shot him. She was acquitted.

She soon became involved in espionage, sending information to Confederate generals Thomas "Stonewall" Jackson and J.E.B. "Jeb" Stuart. Often she was helped by Eliza Corsey, a Boyd family slave whom Belle had taught to read and write. In 1863, Belle was arrested in Martinsburg by the Union Army and imprisoned. Boyd's Greek Revival home, which he had built in 1853 and sold in 1855, had numerous owners over the decades. In 1992 it was purchased by the Berkeley County Historical Society. The historical society renovated the building and now operates it as the Berkeley County Museum. It is also known as the Belle Boyd House.

Reconstruction
Residents of West Virginia were split in their allegiance during the war, with half of its soldiers serving in the Confederate army. The vote to create a new state in western Virginia was very low, but statehood was approved by Congress and President Lincoln, and the new state was admitted to the Union on June 20, 1863.

The city of Martinsburg was incorporated by an act of the new West Virginia Legislature on March 30, 1868.

Martinsburg became a center of the railroad industry and its workers. The Great Railroad Strike of 1877 began July 14, 1877, in this city at the Baltimore and Ohio Railroad Martinsburg Shops. After several unsuccessful attempts to quell the protests, Governor Henry M. Mathews called for federal troops. By the time these troops had restored order, the protest of the rail company had spread across the country.

Telephone service was established in Martinsburg in 1883. In 1889, electricity began to be furnished to Martinsburg as part of a franchise granted to the United Edison Manufacturing Company of New York.

The Interwoven Mills began operations in Martinsburg in 1891.

Construction of the Apollo Civic Theatre was completed in 1913.

World War I and beyond

Over one thousand (1,039) men from Berkeley County participated in World War I. Of these, forty-one were killed, and twenty-one were wounded in battle. A monument to those who fell in battle was erected in Martinsburg in 1925.

During World War II, the Newton D. Baker Hospital in Martinsburg treated thousands of soldiers wounded in the war. In 1946 this military hospital became a part of the Veterans Administration (VA). The VA Medical Center in Martinsburg still provides care to United States veterans.

Due to restructuring beginning in the late 1940s and continuing through the 1970s, many of the mills and factories operating in Martinsburg shut down and went out of business, dealing a major blow to the local economy. Jobs were moved to the Deep South and later offshore.

Geography

Location and topography
Martinsburg is located at  (39.459207, −77.967814). U.S. Route 11 runs through the center of town, and Interstate 81 passes along the northern side of the town.

Martinsburg is  distant from the state capital of Charleston.  However, it is closer to no less than five other state capitals: Harrisburg PA - , Annapolis MD - , Dover DE - , Richmond VA - , and Trenton NJ - .

Climate
Martinsburg lies in the transitional area between  humid subtropical climate (Köppen Cfa) and humid continental climatic zones (Köppen Dfa), with four distinct seasons. Precipitation is moderate, with winter being the driest period and May thru July the wettest.

Demographics

2020 census 
As of the census of 2020, there were 18,777 people residing in the city, living in 7,179 total households. The population density was 2,591.7 inhabitants per square mile. The racial makeup of the city was 79.9% White, 13.9% African American, 0.1% Native American, 1.3% Asian, 0.0% Pacific Islander, and 3.1% two or more races. Hispanic or Latino of any race was 4.8% of the population.

The median household income (in 2019 dollars) was $42,835. The per capita income was $24,970. 29.5% of the population is recorded as being in poverty. 88.5% of households had a computer, with 77.9% having access to broadband internet.

2010 census 
As of the census of 2010, there were 17,227 people, 7,293 households, and 4,106 families residing in the city. The racial makeup of the city was 77.5% White, 14.9% African American, 0.4% Native American, 1.2% Asian, 0.1% Pacific Islander, 2.3% from other races, and 3.7% from two or more races. Hispanic or Latino of any race were 6.2% of the population.

There were 7,293 households, of which 29.6% had children under the age of 18 living with them, 35.3% were married couples living together, 15.0% had a female householder with no husband present, 6.0% had a male householder with no wife present, and 43.7% were non-families. Of all households, 35.4% were made up of individuals, and 12.6% had someone living alone who was 65 years of age or older. The average household size was 2.32 and the average family size was 3.00.

The median age in the city was 37 years. 23.3% of residents were under the age of 18; 8.6% were between the ages of 18 and 24; 28.3% were from 25 to 44; 26.3% were from 45 to 64; and 13.4% were 65 years of age or older. The gender makeup of the city was 48.8% male and 51.2% female.

2000 census
As of the census of 2000, there were 14,972 people, 6,684 households, and 3,689 families residing in the city. The racial makeup of the city was 83.9% White, 11.6% African American, 0.4% Native American, 0.9% Asian, 0% Pacific Islander, 1.3%% from other races, and 2.2% from two or more races. Hispanic or Latino of any race were 2.9% of the population.

There were 6,684 households, out of which 24.9% had children under the age of 18 living with them, 36.7% were married couples living together, 13.7% had a female householder with no husband present, and 44.8% were non-families. 37.6% of all households were made up of individuals, and 15.2% had someone living alone who was 65 years of age or older. The average household size was 2.21 and the average family size was 2.92.

In the city, the population was spread out, with 23.1% under the age of 18, 9.6% from 18 to 24, 28.7% from 25 to 44, 22.3% from 45 to 64, and 16.4% who were 65 years of age or older. The median age was 37 years. For every 100 females, there were 91.0 males. For every 100 females age 18 and over, there were 88.6 males.

The median income for a household in the city was $29,495, and the median income for a family was $36,954. Males had a median income of $29,697 versus $22,212 for females. The per capita income for the city was $16,314. About 14.7% of families and 20.0% of the population were below the poverty line, including 28.8% of those under age 18 and 15.1% of those age 65 or over.

Commerce
Major private employers in and around Martinsburg include Quad/Graphics, Ecolab, Orgill, Macy's, and FedEx. In February 2015, it was announced that Procter & Gamble planned to build a $500 million facility near the city.

The city also has numerous federal government employers, including the Internal Revenue Service (IRS), U.S. Coast Guard C5ISC-Kearneysville, U.S. Coast Guard National Maritime Center, Bureau of Alcohol, Tobacco, Firearms, and Explosives, and the Martinsburg VA Medical Center.

The Martinsburg IRS Facility, one of the two Enterprise Computing Centers of the Internal Revenue Service (the other is in Memphis, Tennessee), processes most of the country's electronically filed tax documents from businesses, and about one-third of electronically filed tax returns.

The area is also home to the 167th Airlift Wing of the West Virginia Air National Guard, based in Eastern WV Regional Airport.

Martinsburg had its own automobile company from 1912 to 1922, called Norwalk, which assembled the longest-made known cars to be built in the state of West Virginia.

Sports 
Major League Baseball Hall of Famer Hack Wilson began his storied professional career in his adopted hometown with the Martinsburg Blue Sox, a low-level minor-league baseball team. Wilson would go on to set the yet-to-be-broken major league record for RBI in a season (191) with the Chicago Cubs in 1930.

After his playing career ended in 1935, Hack went back home to Martinsburg, played some ball with the town's semipro team and opened a recreation and pool hall in town with a partner. He later moved to Baltimore in 1941 where he later died November 23, 1948. Originally scheduled to be interred in Baltimore, Wilson was buried — in a donated plot — in Martinsburg,

Healthcare

 Berkeley Medical Center (formerly WVUH-East City Hospital and City Hospital)
 Veterans Affairs Medical Center

Shopping
Retail centers/areas in Martinsburg include:
 Foxcroft Towne Center: Walmart, Hobby Lobby and Party City. There was originally a shopping mall there, but it shut down in late 2016 .Location: Foxcroft Avenue, Interstate 81 Exit 12 & 13.
 The Commons Shopping Center:  anchored by Target, Dick's Sporting Goods, Best Buy, T.J. Maxx, Famous Footwear, Books-A-Million, Bed Bath and Beyond, Michael's, Petsmart and Five Below. Opened in 2009. Location: Retail Commons Parkway, Interstate 81 Exit 12.
 Old Courthouse Square:  anchored by Martin's Food and Super Shoes. Opened in 1987. Location: Edwin Miller Blvd.
 Apple Harvest Drive: Shop 'n Save, Lowe's, Verizon, Aspen Dental, Harbor Freight and Gabe's.
 North Queen Street: Dairy Queen, Weis Markets, Tractor Supply, and Planet Fitness.
 Other shopping areas in the city are the Berkeley Plaza on Williamsport Pike, Martinsburg Plaza on Winchester Ave, and Meadow Lane Plaza on Meadow Lane.

Education

Elementary and intermediate schools
 Rocky Knoll Adventist School
 Back Creek Valley Elementary
 Bedington Elementary
 Berkeley Heights Elementary
 Bunker Hill Elementary
 Burke Street Elementary
 Gerrardstown Elementary
 Hedgesville Elementary
 Inwood Elementary
 Marlowe Elementary
 Opequon Elementary
 Rosemont Elementary
 Spring Mills Elementary
 Tuscarora Elementary
 Valley View Elementary
 Winchester Avenue Elementary
 Mountain Ridge Intermediate
 Potomac Intermediate
 Orchard View Intermediate
 Mill Creek Intermediate
 Eagle School Intermediate
 Tomahawk Intermediate
 St. Joseph Catholic School

Middle schools
 North Middle
 South Middle
 Spring Mills Middle
 Hedgesville Middle
 Mountain Ridge Middle
 Musselman Middle

High schools
 Martinsburg High School
 Musselman High School
 Hedgesville High School
 Spring Mills High School
 Berkeley STEM Academy

Colleges and universities
 Blue Ridge Community and Technical College, Martinsburg
 James Rumsey Technical Institute, Martinsburg
 Shepherd University-Martinsburg 
 Valley College of Technology, Martinsburg Campus

Transportation

Roads and highways

Martinsburg is served by several significant highways. The most prominent of these is Interstate 81, which is the main north–south highway through the region. I-81 connects northward to Hagerstown and Harrisburg, and continues southward to Winchester and Roanoke. U.S. Route 11, the former primary regional north–south highway, now serves as a local service road to I-81, and travels through downtown Martinsburg. The main highway serving regional east–west travel is West Virginia Route 9. From Martinsburg eastwards, WV 9 follows an expressway, connecting the city to Charles Town and Leesburg. WV 9 follows US 11 through downtown Martinsburg. To the west, WV 9 continues to Berkeley Springs and Paw Paw. West Virginia Route 45 is the other state highway serving Martinsburg. WV 45 extends westward into rural areas of western Berkeley County, and continues eastward to Shepherdstown.

Mass transportation

Amtrak provides service to Martinsburg on its Washington-Chicago Capitol Limited route. The city's passenger rail station is located downtown at 229 East Martin Street. MARC, Maryland's commuter rail system, operates trains on weekdays on its  which terminates in Martinsburg.  Service is provided to Union Station in Washington, D.C.

Eastern Panhandle Transit Authority (EPTA) operates public bus transit routes in Martinsburg, surrounding Berkeley County, and neighboring Jefferson County, West Virginia.

Eastern WV Regional Airport, south of the city, handles general aviation and Shepherd Field Air National Guard Base is located at this airport. The closest airport with commercial air service is Hagerstown Regional Airport, that is about  driving distance north. The closest international airport is Washington Dulles International Airport near D.C., which is about  driving distance east.

Media

Print
 Martinsburg has one daily community newspaper, The Journal and also is regionally covered by The Herald-Mail (Hagerstown, MD)
 Martinsburg has a bi-monthly magazine, Around the Panhandle magazine.

Radio
 The city is home to WEPM/1340 AM, WRNR/740 AM, WICL/95.9 FM, WLTF/97.5 FM, and WVEP/88.9 FM radio stations.

Television
 Martinsburg is home to W08EE-D Channel 8 (West Virginia Public Broadcasting) and WWPX 60 (ION), all part of the Hagerstown sub-market that is further grouped under the Nielsen-designated Washington, D.C.-Hagerstown, Md. market, the ninth largest market in the nation. 
 Martinsburg, WV was the setting of the X-Files episode "Small Potatoes" (Season 4, episode 20). However, the filming did not take place in the vicinity.
 Martinsburg is the setting for the reality television series Gypsy Sisters on TLC.

Notable people
 Newton D. Baker, Secretary of War and Mayor of Cleveland
 Harold H. Bender (1882–1951), professor of philology at Princeton University
 Charles Boarman (1828–1880), physician
 Belle Boyd (1844-1900) Confederate spy in the American Civil War
 Scott Bullett, former outfielder for the Pittsburgh Pirates, Chicago Cubs
 Vicky Bullett, Olympic gold medalist in women's basketball
 Kathe Burkhart, artist, writer, feminist
 Summers Burkhart (1859–1932), attorney
 Harry Flood Byrd, Sr., U.S. Senator and Governor of Virginia
 Robert Lee Castleman, Grammy-winning singer/songwriter
 Danny Casolaro, committed suicide in Martinsburg
 Charles James Faulkner, U.S. Senator from West Virginia
 Karl Hess, former D.C. insider turned Libertarian and appropriate technology activist, relocated to the Martinsburg area in the 1970s.
 Corey Hill, UFC fighter
 Joseph Howard Hodges, (1911-1985), fifth Bishop of the Roman Catholic Diocese of Wheeling
 Charles Porterfield Krauth (1823–1883), Lutheran theologian 
 Shannon Larkin, drummer for the hard rock band Godsmack
 Edward F. McClain, member of the Wisconsin State Assembly
 Walter Dean Myers, author
 John Quincy Adams Nadenbousch, colonel in Confederate States Army
 Mary Elizabeth Price (1877–1965), impressionist painter
 Ronald Radosh, ex-New Left, ex-libertarian, now neoconservative author
 Anthony Senecal, butler of US President Donald Trump, was mayor of Martinsburg from 1990 to 1992
 Absalom Willis Robertson, U.S. Senator from Virginia
 David Hunter Strother (aka Porte Crayon), artist
 Fulton Walker, former football player for the Miami Dolphins
 Garland Wilson (1909–1954), jazz pianist
 Hack Wilson, Hall of Fame baseball player
Mary Ann Shaffer (1934-2008), writer, editor, librarian and noted for her posthumously published work The Guernsey Literary and Potato Peel Pie Society
J.R. Clifford (1848-1933), First African-American attorney in West Virginia. Newspaper publisher and editor, school teacher, principal.  Civil War veteran.  Civil Rights pioneer.  Founding member of the Niagara Movement (forerunner to the NAACP).

References

External links

 
 Official website
 Martinsburg-Berkeley County Chamber of Commerce
 Martinsburg, Virginia, During the Civil War in Encyclopedia Virginia

 
Cities in West Virginia
Cities in Berkeley County, West Virginia
County seats in West Virginia
Populated places established in 1778